Fairview Heights may refer to:

In the United States
Fairview Heights, Illinois
Fairview Heights (St. Louis MetroLink)
Fairview Heights, Virginia
Fairview Heights station (Los Angeles Metro)

In New Zealand
Fairview Heights, New Zealand